Felix Winiwarter (21 March 1930 – 9 September 2018) was Austrian chess player, Austrian Chess Championship medalist (1956).

Biography
From the late 1950s to the early 1970s Felix Winiwarter was one of the leading Austrian chess players. In 1965, in Reichenau an der Rax he won silver medal in Austrian Chess Championship.

Felix Winiwarter played for Austria in the Chess Olympiads:
 In 1964, at second reserve board in the 16th Chess Olympiad in Tel Aviv (+5, =2, -3),
 In 1966, at fourth board in the 17th Chess Olympiad in Havana (+7, =5, -5).

Felix Winiwarter played for Austria in the European Team Chess Championship preliminaries:
 In 1957, at eighth board in the 1st European Team Chess Championship preliminaries (+1, =4, -1),
 In 1961, at seventh board in the 2nd European Team Chess Championship preliminaries (+2, =3, -4),
 In 1965, at fourth board in the 3rd European Team Chess Championship preliminaries (+1, =4, -1),
 In 1970, at seventh board in the 4th European Team Chess Championship preliminaries (+1, =0, -3),

Felix Winiwarter played for Austria in the Clare Benedict Chess Cups:
 In 1958, at third board in the 5th Clare Benedict Chess Cup in Neuchâtel (+1, =1, -3),
 In 1967, at third board in the 14th Clare Benedict Chess Cup in Leysin (+0, =1, -3).

Since the early 1990s for a considerable time Felix Winiwarter participated in the European and World level senior chess tournaments.

References

External links

Felix Winiwarter chess games at 365chess.com

1930 births
2018 deaths
Austrian chess players
Chess Olympiad competitors